I Love How You Love Me was Bobby Vinton's eighteenth studio album, released in 1968. The title track was previously a major hit for the Paris Sisters in 1961.

Two singles came from this album: the title track, which reached No. 9 in the United States and "Halfway to Paradise" (US #23, previously a hit for Tony Orlando and Billy Fury). Cover versions include "Those Were the Days", "Till", "For Once in My Life", "Why Don't You Believe Me" and the Drifters' hit "Save the Last Dance for Me".

The album cover photo features Vinton receiving a hug from Susan Szasz. She was the winner of a contest run by Epic Records to become the cover girl of a Bobby Vinton album.

Track listing

Personnel
Bobby Vinton - vocals
Billy Sherrill - producer
Bill McElhiney - arranger ("Those Were the Days", "For Once in My Life", "Till" and "Save the Last Dance for Me")
Don Tweedy - arranger ("Together")
Suzanne Szasz - cover photo

Charts

Singles - Billboard (North America)

References

1968 albums
Bobby Vinton albums
Albums produced by Billy Sherrill
Epic Records albums